GOOD Fridays was a weekly free music release by rapper Kanye West, launched in support of his fifth studio album My Beautiful Dark Twisted Fantasy (2010). The original intention was to release a free new song every Friday for a few months to promote his album, and the weekly tracks generally featured various rappers from his label, GOOD Music, and other artists he usually collaborated with. All of the GOOD Friday tracks come with their own cover art. West initially announced that the free music program releases songs from August 20, 2010, to Christmas 2010. However at the beginning of November, West announced that he was extending GOOD Fridays until the end of January. 15 GOOD Friday tracks have been released through the program and three tracks appeared on West's album My Beautiful Dark Twisted Fantasy. West described the series as "an exercise in the power of art."

Songs

2010

References

Kanye West
2010 in music